Askjell Solstrand, also known mononymously as Askjell, is a Norwegian record producer and songwriter, currently based in Bergen, Norway. He has grown as an affiliate with acts, including Sigrid, Aurora and Iris. He has also released two extended plays, entitled Requiem and To Be Loved, as a solo artist in 2019. His debut album, everything will be ok, was released in 2022.

Discography

Studio albums

Extended plays

Singles

Songwriting and production credits

Remixes
 Sigrid - "High Five" (2018)
 Aurora - "The River" (2019)

References

Living people
Musicians from Bergen
Norwegian record producers
Norwegian songwriters
Year of birth missing (living people)